Stewart Fellows (born 9 October 1948) is an English former professional footballer who played as a half-back in the Football League for York City, in non-League football for King's Lynn, and was on the books of Newcastle United without making a league appearance.

References

1948 births
Living people
Footballers from Stockton-on-Tees
Footballers from County Durham
English footballers
Association football midfielders
Newcastle United F.C. players
York City F.C. players
King's Lynn F.C. players
English Football League players